Tomasz Kowalski (born 14 September 1992) is a Polish footballer who plays as a midfielder for KP Ostrovia Ostrów Wielkopolski.

External links

References

1992 births
Place of birth missing (living people)
Living people
Polish footballers
Poland youth international footballers
Association football midfielders
UKS SMS Łódź players
Tur Turek players
Jagiellonia Białystok players
Widzew Łódź players
Arka Gdynia players
ŁKS Łódź players
Sokół Ostróda players
Górnik Konin players
Ekstraklasa players
I liga players
II liga players
III liga players